Moovattumugam is a hamlet situated 2 km north-west to Thiruvattar, where the rivers Kothai and Pahrali unify to flow southwest towards the Arabian Sea. There is an ancient Sastha Temple is situated the bank of Moovattumugom. Every year 1000 of hindhus visiting here for Balidharpanam on karkidavaavu foe remebering their Ancestors. This temple situated in the bank of the river which is very natural beuty. Thottavaram Lady of assumption Church and CSI Church Thottavaram  are adjacent to this hamlet. Zigma Sports and arts club is the one of the youth sports and arts development club in Thottavaram (Moovattumugam ). Village towns Attoor & Thiruvattar are 1.5 km away.

Villages in Kanyakumari district
Thiruvattar